The Daira Din Panah goat is a breed of domestic goat from the Multan and Muzaffargarh districts of the Punjab province of Pakistan. It is used primarily for milk production. The registered population was reported in 2006 as 142,403.

References

Dairy goat breeds
Goat breeds originating in Pakistan
Livestock in Punjab